Gerolamo Pallavicini (died 1503) was a Roman Catholic prelate who served as Bishop of Novara (1485–1503).

Biography
On 18 April 1485, Gerolamo Pallavicini was appointed during the papacy of Pope Innocent VIII as Bishop of Novara.
He served as Bishop of Novara until his death on 18 August 1503.
While bishop, he was the principal co-consecrator of Nikolaus Schinner, Bishop of Sion (1498).

References

External links and additional sources
 (for Chronology of Bishops) 
 (for Chronology of Bishops) 

15th-century Italian Roman Catholic bishops
16th-century Italian Roman Catholic bishops
Bishops appointed by Pope Innocent VIII
1503 deaths